Tibor Karczag (born 9 September 1967 in Győr) is a Hungarian weightlifter. He competed in the Olympic Games in 1992 and 1996. In Barcelona (1992) finished 6th place in 56 kg category. Four years later, in Atlanta he missed all of his 107.5 kg snatch attempt and did not finish the competition in the 54 kg category.

Major results

References

External links
Tibor Karczag at sports-reference.com

1967 births
Living people
Hungarian male weightlifters
Olympic weightlifters of Hungary
Weightlifters at the 1992 Summer Olympics
Weightlifters at the 1996 Summer Olympics
People from Győr